Svetlana Alexandrovna Mulyavina-Penkina (Belarusian: Святлана Аляксандраўна Пенкіна; 6 June 1951 – October 2016) was a Soviet actress.

Career
Svetlana Penkina graduated from the Minsk Theater and Art Institute. She got the first taste of success for her role of Katya Bulavina in the Soviet thirteen-episode television drama series The Road to Calvary based on the trilogy The Road to Calvary by Aleksey Tolstoy. The role was her diploma work at the Minsk Theater Institute.

While working on the character, the young actress co-starred in two films. In the movie Dust in the Sun she played Anna Mikhailovna, an associate of Lithuanian revolutionary Joseph Vareikis. In The Color of Gold she appeared in one of the starring roles, Zoya.

In 1982, she played Lida in The Solar Wind. In 1985, she had the role of secretary Vika in For The Coming Age, the adaptation of the novel by Soviet writer Georgiy Markov. Soon after that, she retired from movie roles.

Personal life
Svetlana Penkina was born in 1951 in Belarus. the daughter of Alexander Pavlovich Penkin, who was a colonel in the army. In 1981, she married musician and singer Vladimir Mulyavin (1941– 2003); the couple had one child, a son, Valery Vladimirovich Mulyavin (born 1982). After her husband's (Vladimir Mulyavin) death, she changed her surname to Svetlana Mulyavina-Penkina.

Death
On 20 October 2016, her body was found in her home. She was 65 years old. Buried with her husband Vladimir Mulyavin (1941-2003)

Filmography
 1971 - The Tomb of the lion (Могила льва)            as (minor role)
 1972 - The day of my sons (День моих сыновей)      as Serova, patient
 1974 - The Road to Calvary (Хождение по мукам)     as Katya Bulavina
 1974 - The Color of Gold (Цвет золота)            as Zoya
 1977 - And we had some quiet... (А у нас была тишина...) as  Gustenka Drozdova
 1977 - Dust in The Sun    (Пыль под солнцем)       as  Anna
 1978 - Order No. 1 (TV show) (Приказ номер один)      as Orlova
 1981 - Care for women (Берегите женщин)        as Olga (major role)
 1982 - The Solar Wind (Солнечный ветер)        as Lida, Chebyshev's employee
 1985 - For The Coming Age  (Грядущему веку)         as Vika, secretary

References

External links
 
 Русская Германия: Как сложилась судьба «Кати» из «Хождения по мукам»? 

1951 births
2016 deaths
Soviet film actresses
Soviet television actresses
Actors from Minsk